Stephen D. Barnett (born c. 1969) is an active duty United States Navy officer and career naval flight officer who serves as the commander of Navy Region Hawaii since June 17, 2022. He most recently served as commander of Navy Region Southwest from July 16, 2021 to May 23, 2022, and before that as commander, Navy Region Northwest from March 2021 to June 2021.

Early life and education 
Barnett is a native of Columbia, Tennessee. He is an alumnus of Tennessee State University, where he received his Bachelor of Science in mechanical engineering, and Troy State University, where he earned his Master of Business Administration. He earned his commission at Aviation Officer Candidate School in 1991.

Military career 
At sea, Barnett reported to Patrol Squadron (VP) 46 stationed at Naval Air Station Whidbey Island, Washington as a naval flight officer. He has also served as the operations department administration officer on board , and served as a department head for VP-5 stationed at Naval Air Station Jacksonville, Florida. As commanding officer of VP-47 stationed at Kaneohe, Hawaii, he led the squadron on a simultaneous deployment to Japan and Iraq, executing more than 250 missions in support of Operation Iraqi Freedom. During his tour, the squadron completed more than 950 sorties comprising 5,000 hours.

His assignments ashore include serving as a detailer at the Bureau of Naval Personnel, directing the assignments of more than 1,000 naval aviators; naval flight officer instructor for VP-30, NAS Jacksonville; assistant Joint Requirements Oversight Council Secretariat, assisting in the evaluation and development of joint force requirements on the Joint Chiefs of Staff.
Barnett served as senior program analyst for Chief of Naval Operations (OPNAV N80), he monitored naval aviation's $137 billion annual budget, and as deputy executive assistant to the Vice Chief of Naval Operations. Additional assignments include deputy director of the Resource Management Division for the Chief of Naval Operations (Manpower Personnel, Training, and Education); commanding officer of Naval Base Coronado, California, and later as chief of staff for Commander, Navy Region Southeast and Commander, Navy Installations Command. He then served as deputy commander, Navy Installations Command.

Barnett assumed duties as commander, Navy Region Northwest in March 2020 and relinquished command to Brad J. Collins in June 2021.

In March 2022, he was reassigned as commander of Navy Region Hawaii, succeeding Timothy Kott. He relinquished command of Navy Region Southwest to Rear Admiral Bradley N. Rosen on May 23, 2022.

In February 2023, Barnett was nominated for promotion to rear admiral.

References 

1960s births
Year of birth uncertain
Living people
United States Navy officers
African-American United States Navy personnel
Tennessee State University alumni
21st-century African-American people
20th-century African-American people